Ela is a female first name. It comes from the Aramaic word Elah meaning "oak". It is a nickname for Elen, Eliška, Elizabeth, Elektra, Angela or Eleanor.
In Turkish Ela means Hazel.
Notable people with the name include:

 Ela of Salisbury, 3rd Countess of Salisbury (1187–1261), English noblewoman
 Ela Bhatt (born 1933), Indian co-operative organiser and activist
 Ela Collins (1786–1848), American lawyer and politician
 Ela Darling (born 1986), American pornographic actress and businesswoman
 Ela Longespee (1244–1276), English heiress
 Ela Gandhi (born 1940), Indian politician and activist
 Ela Lehotská (born 1973), Slovak actress
 Ela Q. May, child actress of the Edwardian era
 Ela Orleans (born 1971), Polish composer
 Ela Peroci (1922–2001), Slovene writer
 Ela Pitam (born 1977), Israeli chess grandmaster
 Ela Stein-Weissberger (1930–2018), Czech holocaust survivor
 Ela Velden (born 1972), Mexican actress and model
 Ela Weber (born 1966), German model, showgirl and actress

See also
 Ela (surname)

References

Hebrew feminine given names
Turkish feminine given names